Association for the Protection of Mixed Families Rights (AMF) is a grassroots organization that helps  interfaith families  and their descendants in Israel.

History
AMF, established in 1999,  addresses the legal challenges presented by the Law of Return and manages programs which include a hotline for people in three languages providing them with information regarding their religious classification and assistance with legal and bureaucratic issues that affect civil status as well as advocacy and lobbying. The association has also conducted sociological surveys concerning mixed families and held conferences based on the Naturalization and integration challenges for mixed families.

References

External links 
 

Anti-racist organizations in Israel
Legal organizations based in Israel
Jewish marital law
Interfaith marriage
Organizations established in 1999
1999 establishments in Israel